{{Speciesbox
|image =Echinocereus chisoensis var fobeanus pm 01.jpg 
|image_caption =Echinocereus chisoensis
|name = Chisos Mountain hedgehog cactus
|status = G2
|status_system = TNC
|taxon = Echinocereus chisoensis
|authority = W.T.Marsh
|synonyms_ref=
|synonyms=*Echinocereus chisosensis W.T.Marsh
Echinocereus metornii G.Frank
Echinocereus fobeanus' Oehme
|}}Echinocereus chisoensis is a rare North American species of cactus known by the common name Chisos Mountain hedgehog cactus, native to the Chihuahuan Desert of northern Mexico and the south-central United States.Echinocereus chisoensis is an inconspicuous plant, forming small loose clumps. Stems are up to 30 cm (1 foot) long, sometimes erect but sometimes partially reclining on the ground. Flowers can be up to 10 cm (4 inches) long, whitish along the throat, with red or purple spots near the base, and pink near the tips. Anthers are yellow, fruit green.

Varieties
There are two varieties of this species, both rare.

Echinocereus chisoensis var. fobeanus
The variety Echinocereus chisoensis var. fobeanus is known only from south of the Río Grande, between Coahuila and Durango in Mexico.Echinocereus chisoensis. The Nature Conservancy. This variety is sometimes regarded as a distinct species, Echinocereus fobeanus.Echinocereus chisoensis var. chisoensis
The rare variety  Echinocereus chisoensis var. chisoensis is known only from alluvial flats in desert scrub habitat. The soil is rocky and gravelly. It is endemic to Brewster County, Texas, with all occurrences located within Big Bend National Park. It is a federally listed threatened species of the United States.  Other plants in the area include creosote (Larrea tridentata) and lechuguilla (Agave lechuguilla''). Creosote and similar shrubs act as nurse plants for the cactus.

The "incredibly spectacular" pink flowers of this plant have made it a target for cactus collectors, who are a major threat to the survival of the species. There are only about 1000 individuals existing.

Pollination
Because it is self-incompatible, flowers of one cactus require pollen from another individual of the species for fertilization; when plants are rare and spread apart, the likelihood that a pollinator will stop at the plant and deliver the correct pollen is lower. When fruits are successfully produced, they are often taken by jackrabbits and rodents for food. Dry conditions may increase this herbivory and decrease pollinator abundance.

See also
Cryptantha crassipes
Escobaria minima
Flora of the Chihuahuan Desert

References

External links
United States Department of Agriculture Plants Profile — Echinocereus chisoensis

chisoensis
Cacti of Mexico
Cacti of the United States
Flora of the Chihuahuan Desert
Flora of Coahuila
Flora of Durango
Flora of Texas
Flora of the Rio Grande valleys
Big Bend National Park
Brewster County, Texas
Plants described in 1940
Endangered flora of the United States